Leptolaena abrahamii is a species of flowering plant in the family Sarcolaenaceae. It is found only in Madagascar. Its natural habitat is mid-elevation humid tropical forests. It is threatened by habitat loss.

Description
Leptolaena abrahamii is a shrub to medium-sized tree. It flowers and fruits from October to June.

Range and habitat
Leptolaena abrahamii is native to the eastern slope of Madagascar's Central Highlands. There are 17 known subpopulations. It occurs in Analamazaotra National Park, Ambatovy, and around Moramanga north-northeast to Zahamena National Park, and further south in Ampasinambo and Ranomafana National Park. The species' estimated extent of occurrence (EOO) is 9,891.1 km2, and its estimated area of occupancy (AOO) is 104 km2.

The species grows in mid-elevation humid montane evergreen forest between 729 and 1,097 meters elevation. It sometimes found in degraded remant vegetation, and grows on crust or lateritic soils.

Conservation and threats
The species is threatened by habitat loss from human activity, including deforestation for shifting cultivation and mining and by human-caused fires. It is intolerant of forest disturbance. It is also threatened by logging for timber, and reduced populations of seed-dispersing animals like birds and lemurs.

Eight subpopulations are within protected areas, including Analamazaotra National Park, Ankeniheny-Zahamena Corridor (Main parcel and Vohibe Forest), Ranomafana National Park, Torotorofotsy Ramsar Site, and Zahamena National Park.

Uses
The tree's timber is used for posts, house frames, planks, lumber, and fuel wood. Parts of the tree are used for traditional medicine. The bark is used to make a local alcoholic beverage.

References

abrahamii
Endemic flora of Madagascar
Flora of the Madagascar subhumid forests
Endangered plants
Taxonomy articles created by Polbot